Sollentuna socken is a former socken of Sollentuna Hundred in Uppland, Sweden. The area largely corresponds to the modern Sollentuna Municipality, but not completely. Hansta was incorporated into Stockholm Municipality in 1980, while other localities (such as Silverdal) were incorporated into the municipality from other parishes.

Edsberg Castle, the seat farm of Sollentunaholm, the locality of Sjöberg, the municipal districts of Rotebro, Viby, Norrviken, Vaxmora, Häggvik, Edsberg, Tureberg, and Helenelund as well as Sollentuna Station and the parish church of Sollentuna were located in the parish.

Geography
Sollentuna Parish was located north of Stockholm, around the northern parts of Edsviken and the southern parts of Norrviken and straddling the Stockholmsåsen esker, running in a north-south direction.

Etymology
The name (written as Solendatunum in 1287) was taken from the church village. The ending tuna traces its roots to an archaic word for 'enclosure'. The beginning of the word is from the name soländar, which denotes an inhabitant of Soland. This derives in turn from the word land, meaning 'village', and likely the prefix sol, meaning 'sun'. This has a somewhat ambiguous interpretation, but may have referred to a sunlit place.

Administrative history

Sollentuna Parish is first found in written records in 1287 (as 'de Solendatunum'). The oldest parts of Sollentuna Church Sollentuna were built around the end of the 12th century.

With the municipality reform of 1862, the ecclesiastical and civil functions of the parish were separated. The religious responsibilities fell to the local ecclesiastical parish of the Church of Sweden, while the secular responsibilities fell to Sollentuna landskommun. The landskommun became Sollentuna köping in 1944, which in turn became the modern Sollentuna Municipality in 1971.

Men from the parish were conscripted into the Life Regiment Dragoons Corps. Sailors were conscripted into the Södra Roslags 2:a båtsmanskompani.

Historical and archaeological sites 
There are a number of gravrösen (a sort of chambered cairn) dating back to the Bronze Age scattered throughout the municipality. A dozen runic inscriptions have been found.

References

Sockens in Sweden
Tumuli in Sweden
Diocese of Stockholm (Church of Sweden)